B’TWIN is a trademarked brand of bicycles as well as bicycle parts and accessories marketed by Decathlon.

The bicycles are produced by several manufacturers in Asia and Europe. In 2010, a small part of the assembly process was relocated to France.
From 2008–18, more than 1 million bicycles were produced in Portugal. They also sold bike accessories and parts for budget prices.

In March 2018, Decathlon said it planned to drop the B’Twin name completely 
Over approximately the following year, the company migrated the B’Twin brand to children's bikes, as part of a branding arrangement that will see new ranges of bicycles, including both road and mountain bikes.

At present, the B'Twin brand is used for folding bikes and some bicycle accessories, in addition to the aforementioned children's bikes.

Ranges
B'Twin's product range includes:

 Kids' city bikes - City bikes designed for children
 Tilt - Budget folding bikes available in pedal-powered and electric versions

The B'Twin brand formerly encompassed these additional products which have since been turned into separate brands:
 Riverside/Original - entry-level hybrid bikes
 Triban - road bikes including some UCI approved models
 Rockrider - mountain bikes
Elops - Classic city bikes pedal or electric models
Long distance city bikes - Bikes built for long distance rides, with only pedal-powered versions available
ATB bikes - All terrain bikes
Nework - active urban bikes

References

External links
 B’TWIN's  official site

Decathlon Group
Cycle manufacturers of France
Mountain bike manufacturers